Wang Runze (born November 28, 1993), also known as Runze Wang, is a Chinese actor. He portrayed Tian Ye in the Meteor Garden 2018. Wang is also well known for his roles in A Little Thing Called First Love (2019), Professional Single (2020) and Don't Disturb My Study (2021).

Early life
Wang Run Ze was born on November 28, 1993, in Huainan, China. His parents divorced when he was 8 months old, and was raised by his grandmother. His family condition was not so good. He graduated from Anqing University where he studied financial management. He had a passion in acting since childhood.

Career
In 2016, he participated in the recording of Hunan Satellite TV's original campus documentary reality show "First Grade Graduation Season"; during this period, he not only took the t-show in Shanghai Fashion Week, but also played a drug seller in the graduation stage play "Legend of swordsman".

In 2017, Zhang Yuge and Qiao chuhang took the lead in starring in the mysterious campus network drama "The King Of School Flowers In Tianxia", which is his first film and television drama work, and thus officially entered the performing arts circle as an actor.
In the same year, he co-starred in the crime suspense network drama "Visible Lie", which is adapted from the horror suspense novel "Mystery Case Chasing Murderer".

In 2018, he starred in the youth love idol drama "Meteor Garden 2018".

On July 2, 2019, he starred in the Tencent video All-Star Basketball Competition Reality Show "Super Penguin League Super 3: Star Field". 

In 2019, he starred in TV series "A Little Thing Called First Love", which premiered in the youth progressive theater of Hunan Satellite TV, playing Lin Kai Tuo.

In 2020, he starred in "Professional Single" as Song Siyi.
 
In June 2020, he was cast in the leading youth growth drama "Don't Disturb My Study" (2021) as Liu Yu Bai alongside Lai Kuan-lin and Li Landi as the main leads.

On March 8, 2021, the youth growth drama "Don't Disturb My Study" premiered in the youth progressive theater of Hunan Satellite TV.

On May 26, 2021, he starred as a main lead in "Maid Escort".

Filmography

Television series

References

External links 
http://www.chinesedrama.info/1998/05/actor-wang-run-ze.html?m=1

https://www.viki.com/celebrities/22744pr-wang-run-ze?locale=en

 :zh:%E7%8E%8B%E6%BD%A4%E6%BE%A4

https://movie.douban.com/celebrity/1364986/

 :zh:%E5%88%AB%E6%83%B3%E6%89%93%E6%89%B0%E6%88%91%E5%AD%A6%E4%B9%A0

Chinese male television actors
1993 births
Living people